There have been calls for artefacts originally found in or culturally important to Wales, to be returned to Wales from museums outside Wales such as in England and France.

General proposals 

There have been calls in Welsh media to return some of the more significant artefacts back to which were discovered in Wales. These include artefacts from the British Museum, such as the Rhyd-y-gors shield, Moel Hebog shield and Welsh buckler shields. There are also calls to return the Mold Cape (currently housed in London), Llanllyfni lunula, the Trawsfynydd Tankard (in Liverpool), Red Book of Hergest (in Oxford) and the Red Lady of Paviland (in Oxford), Bardsey crown (in Liverpool), and Owain Glyndŵr's Pennal Letter (in Paris, France) to a museum in Wales.

Historian John Davies noted that "Our treasures are vital to us as a nation and draw people together. They help people imagine the period, and shape how people feel about their area", but "sometimes the expertise is not here in Wales so we have to ask how to deal with that if the treasures come home".

In 2011, it was stated by Linda Tomos, the Director of CyMAL: Museums Archives and Libraries Wales, in response to a query from the Celtic League on the Rhayader Treasure, that the calling for the return of artefacts was not part of the Welsh Government's strategy at the time.

Example artefacts

Gold Mold Cape 

For the case of the Mold gold cape's repatriation, a 4,000-year-old corselet, various local politicans have called for its return. In 2002, Alison Halford, Delyn AM (Welsh Assembly Member) called for the British Museum to return the artefact to a north Wales museum. The artefact is said to be held in London over security concerns at north Wales museums, with Halford stating if there were "such a museum [in north Wales] we would be able to a legitimate claim for [its] return". In 2011, the Celtic League and Plaid Cymru's Westminster leader Elfyn Llwyd backed similar calls. 

In 2013, the cape was temporarily returned to Wales on loan, with a local tourism chair expressing his disappointment with being unable to have it permanently return, and hopeful a new local museum can house it in the future.

In 2018, Delyn AM Hannah Blythyn repeated calls for its return, raising the matter in the Welsh Assembly and with the First Minister.‌ ​﻿‌﻿‌﻿‍﻿‌﻿​﻿‌﻿‌﻿‌﻿​﻿‌﻿​﻿‍﻿‌﻿​﻿‌ In the same year, Denbighshire councillor Mabon ap Gwynfor, tweeted for the﻿ cape to be returned to Wales.

In 2022, academic and former librarian of the National Library of Wales Andrew Green called for the British museum to return artefacts, including the cape to Wales.

Red Lady of Paviland 

Red Lady of Paviland (which are actually of a man) was discovered in 1823 by William Buckland a geology professor at Oxford University, and it was quickly transported to Oxford thereafter (some other artefacts were later repatriated). This prompted a two-century campaign for it to be repatriated. In 2004, a Swansea councillor Ioan Richard started a campaign to get the Red Lady back in Wales who said that "this very important piece of history has been taken from the Welsh by the English". In 2006, it was agreed the artefact would be temporarily loaned to the National Museum of Wales.

In 2013, former chairman of the Welsh Conservatives, Byron Davies called the artefact to "come home", and Davies said he had been given the go-ahead from the UK Government to put together a formal bid to repatriate the ancient remains. Davies reiterated his campaign for the artefacts repatriation to Swansea in 2023, but admitted as the remains were delicate and the cost involved in finding a permanent home in Wales, he stated he was unsure if it were to ever happen. Liverpool and Coimbra University professor George Nash, questioned the mysticism over the artefact, but stated as it is important to Welsh history, and in the event it can be returned safely to Wales, it would "be the right thing to do".

In January 2023, the artefact was nicknamed the Welsh Elgin Marbles, after another artefact with calls for repatriation from the British Museum to Greece. The Red Lady is currently on display in the University of Oxford’s Museum of Natural History, and is described to be "well cared for". It has been stated by academics at Cardiff University, that if it were to return, it would have great importance to enhance Wales' national collection, its archaeology and caves, although whether it would return "as an ancestor or an exhibit".

Owain Glyndŵr's Pennal letter and seal 

Pennal Letter is held in Paris, France after being sent by Owain Glyndŵr to the king of France in 1406. It has been backed by periodic calls for its return to Wales.

In 1999, an early day motion to the House of Commons, signed by 28 members, called for the letter and the seal to be repatriated from the French National Library in France, reasoning that it was of "great historical significance in Wales as rare treasures of Welsh history" and should be exhibited in Wales. The motion was supported by the politicians Paul Flynn, Alun Michael and Ron Davies.

In 2022, Welsh singer Gwilym Bowen Rhys made similar calls.

Bardsey crown 

Welsh pressure group Cyfeillion Llyn (Friends of Llyn) have called for the return of the Bardsey (Enlli) crown, discovered on Bardsey Island. The group want the crown to be moved to Oriel Plas Glyn-y-Weddw, in Llanbedrog.

List of Welsh archaeological objects held in England 

 Mold gold cape – held in the British Museum, London, England
 Red Lady of Paviland – held in Oxford University Museum of Natural History, Oxford, England
 Red Book of Hergest – held in Jesus College of Oxford University, Oxford, England
 Rhyd-y-gors Shield – held in the British Museum, London, England
 Moel Hebog shield – held in the British Museum, London, England
 Llanllyfni lunula – held in the British Museum, London, England
 Trawsfynydd Tankard – held in National Museums Liverpool, Liverpool, England
 Bardsey crown – held in National Museums Liverpool, Liverpool, England

References 

Archaeology of Wales
Welsh artefacts
Art and cultural repatriation
Artefacts repatriation